Rocks State Park is a public recreation area located in and around Deer Creek Valley near Pylesville, Harford County, Maryland. The state park's  preserve the geologic formation known as the King and Queen's Seat and other features in three non-contiguous areas near the junction of Maryland Route 24 and Maryland Route 165. It is managed by the Maryland Department of Natural Resources.

History
The belief that the King and Queen's Seat rock formation was used by Native Americans for ceremonial purposes stems from a book published in 1880 by Thomas Wysong entitled The Rocks of Deer Creek: Their Legends and History. Wysong's account was written for "the young people especially,... mingling fact and fancy." An archaeological investigation by the Maryland State Highway Administration begun in 2005 failed to find evidence that the site had significance to modern Indians as a “traditional cultural property.” The “Rocks of Deer Creek” were already a tourist attraction in the 19th century, served by the Maryland and Pennsylvania Railroad at milepost 35.3 until 1958. The state purchased 82 acres at the site in 1949, opening it under the name Deer Creek State Park in 1953.

Park areas
Main The park has three noncontiguous sections in Deer Creek Valley. The largest section, home to park headquarters, is located along Rocks Ridge and is home to the King and Queen's Seat rock formation, a  rock outcropping that towers above the banks of Deer Creek. 
It is home to Kilgore Falls, the second highest waterfall in Maryland. Unfortunately, due to Tuck Everlasting, the tree that was called “Falling Branch” was cut down for filming. 

Activities and amenities
Hunting and fishing are also available.

In popular culture
Kilgore Falls and the King and Queen's Seat rock formation were featured in the movie Tuck Everlasting.

References

External links

Rocks State Park Maryland Department of Natural Resources
Rocks State Park Map Maryland Department of Natural Resources

State parks of Maryland
Parks in Harford County, Maryland
Protected areas established in 1949